Crookedest railroad may refer to:

Mount Tamalpais and Muir Woods Railway
San Joaquin and Eastern Railroad